Shawn Porter vs. Kell Brook was a professional boxing match contested between IBF welterweight champion Shawn Porter and the IBF's number one ranked contender Kell Brook. The bout took place on August 16, 2014 at the StubHub Center in Carson, California. Brook defeated Porter by majority decision, with two judges scoring the bout 117–111 and 116–112 in favour of Brook, while the third scored it a draw at 114–114.

Background

Porter
Shawn Porter had won his world title by defeating Devon Alexander on December 7, 2013. He went on to defend his title against Paulie Malignaggi on April 19, 2014.
He went into the fight with Brook as a heavy favourite, with boxers Keith Thurman, Amir Khan and Devon Alexander all predicting Porter would knock Brook out.

Brook
Kell Brook had been in line to face the IBF champion since October, 2012. Although he had been rated as the number 1 contender for nearly two years, many boxing experts questioned his previous opposition, and felt Porter would be too big a step up.

The Fight
Despite being a heavy underdog, Brook boxed well against Porter, and collected the victory via a majority decision. 

Brook: 441 Thrown, 158 Landed, 36% Connect Rate

Porter: 626 Thrown, 154 Landed, 25% Connect Rate

Post Fight
Brook stated he was confident he had won the fight afterwards, whilst Porter said he felt he was "still the champion."
There was criticism from Kenny Porter, Shawn Porter's father and trainer, about what he perceived as excessive clinching from Kell Brook despite Porter being just as bad or more so by hitting Brook at the back of the head.

Fight Purses 
 Shawn Porter ($500,000) lost Kell Brook ($200,000)
 Sakio Bika ($700,000) lost Anthony Dirrell ($500,000)
 Deontay Wilder ($50,000) def. Jason Gavern ($32,500)
 Omar Figueroa ($270,000) def. Daniel Estrada ($130,000)

References

Boxing matches
2014 in boxing
2014 in sports in California
August 2014 sports events in the United States